An albino' redwood is a redwood tree which is unable to produce chlorophyll, and has white needles instead of the normal green. It survives by obtaining sugar through the connections between its roots and those of neighboring normal redwood(s), usually the parent tree from whose base it has sprouted. Sap exchange through roots is a general phenomenon among redwoods. About 400 are known. They can be found in Henry Cowell Redwoods State Park, Humboldt Redwoods State Park, San Francisco botanical gardens, and The Santa Lucia Preserve, with eleven trees in the first. The exact locations are not publicized to protect the rare trees. Other conifers lack the ability to graft their roots,  so 'albino' mutants of other species do not survive to become sizable trees. 

The trees were important to Native Americans and were recorded in their legends. For example, the Pomo people used them in their cleansing ceremonies. 

Albino redwoods are generally regarded as parasitic plants, but as of 2016 one researcher speculates that they are supported by other trees for their role in storing toxic heavy metals. Albinos apparently accumulate more metals than normal trees because of defective stomata, which cause them to lose more water through transpiration, forcing them to compensate by taking up more water through their roots.

Six phenotypes of albino redwood have been classified: white, bright yellow, cellular virescent green, pale green, mottled and nonchimeric variegated. Such mutants can be either basal (growing from a burl at the base of a  tree) or aerial (branching off from a tree above the ground). The bright yellow form is exclusively aerial and is thought to be associated with excess xanthophyll production. The pale green form lacks just one specific type of chlorophyll and is almost always basal. Cellular virescent green trees have a few normal cells (whose abundance may vary over time) interspersed among the mutant cells.

Ten cases are known of chimeric redwoods that have a mosaic of albino and normal tissues. Only a single chimeric redwood is known to produce cones. Formerly threatened by the Sonoma–Marin Area Rail Transit rail development, it has since been replanted.

Three phenotypes of chimeric redwoods have been noted: sectorial, mericlinal and periclinal. In sectorial mutants, albino cells are present vertically through all cell layers, with genotype boundaries usually parallel to the stem. Mericlinal trees have mutant cells in only some cell layers and have an unstable phenotype; the albino cells can disappear and reappear in successive years. A periclinal chimera has both mutant and normal cells distributed horizontally across the tip of each bud propagating at equal rates, leading to a very stable phenotype.

Notes

References

Additional reading

External links
Chimera Redwoods web site
Albino Leaves in Sequoia sempervirens Shows Altered Anatomy and Accumulation of Heavy Metals Symposium Poster

Albinism
Sequoia (genus)
Parasitic plants